Padmeswar Deley is an Asom Gana Parishad politician from Assam. He was elected in Assam Legislative Assembly election in 1985 and 1991 from Majuli constituency.

References 

Asom Gana Parishad politicians
Assam MLAs 1985–1991
Assam MLAs 1991–1996
People from Majuli district
Year of birth missing
Possibly living people